Defeater is an American melodic hardcore band from Massachusetts, formed in 2004 within the Boston hardcore scene. To date they have released five full-length albums, two EPs and three singles. The band lineup consists of Derek Archambault (vocals), Jake Woodruff (guitar), Joe Longobardi (drums) and Mike Poulin (bass). All of the band's works have been released via Bridge 9 Records, aside from the album Travels, which was initially released via Topshelf Records, but was later reissued on Bridge 9 Records. Their studio album, Letters Home, was released on July 16, 2013 and debuted at number 72 on Billboard Top 200 chart, number 1 on the vinyl chart and number 13 on the Current Alternative Album chart. They released an album in 2015 titled, Abandoned and in 2019 they released their self-titled album.

Defeater has toured with the likes of La Dispute, Carpathian, Comeback Kid, Bane, Energy. and Miles Away. They supported August Burns Red in 2013. They played the second stage at Hevy Music Festival 2011 and appeared on the second half of the 2013 Vans' Warped Tour, playing on the Monster Stage.

Musical style and lyrics

Defeater is a melodic hardcore band who like to take "creative liberties" when crafting songs. According to guitarist Jay Maas, "There's a prevalent thing in this genre where if you're not doing what hardcore bands have been doing for the last 25 years almost verbatim, you're fucking up." Defeater also showed their softer side with the four acoustic tracks at the end of their second studio album Empty Days & Sleepless Nights.

Lyrically, Defeater is a concept band. All of their music serves as narration over one overarching story, telling of the struggles of a working class New Jersey family in the Post-World War II Era. Vocalist Derek Archambault stated in a 2009 interview that all of Defeater's work would take place within this story.

Their debut album, Travels, established the story and characters. It tells of a younger brother, born to an abusive, alcoholic father who is a veteran of the war. An  older brother who looks down on him and admires his father despite his many faults and an addict mother who gave up trying to find something better when they were children. He grows up in a household that does not want him and eventually runs away from home after killing his father while protecting his mother. He attempts to survive as a drifter before settling in New York City. There he meets another homeless man singing, which inspires him to return and fix the wrongs he left behind. However, in the years that passed, his mother died and the only thing waiting for him is his brother and no chance for redemption.

Their EP Lost Ground tells the story of the beggar from "Prophet in Plain Clothes" in Travels, a homeless street performer whose song inspires the younger brother to stop running from his past and problems. Lost Ground reveals the Prophet's past, an African American World War II veteran that returns home only to find his service and sacrifice means nothing and is shunned for the color of his skin. Hopeless, he becomes an alcoholic train hopper and street performer, singing of his struggles in order to survive hoping that maybe he can change someone's life for the better.

Empty Days & Sleepless Nights returns to the New Jersey family, this time centered around the older brother of the protagonist of Travels and covers the time span directly from the moment in "Forgiver Forgetter" when the father is murdered by the younger brother, up to the younger brother's return in "Debts", albeit from the elder's perspective. The older brother, still struggling to cope with the breakup of his family, begins working to support his heroin addicted mother, all the while under the pressure to live up to the father he idolised and the burning hatred of his brother wishing vengeance on him the moment he returns. However, eventually he decides to settle down and gets married, but his marriage quickly begins to suffer as his drinking takes its toll on him and an old bookie demands payment for his father's debts. After pushing the bookie too far, he knocks the elder brother unconscious in a bar fight. The elder brother returns home later that night to find his wife raped and murdered. With nothing left to live for and his mother's death brought on by her addiction, he works and waits for his brother to return home.

Letters Home features the life of the father of the family, structured in reverse chronological order, each song is a letter that the father wrote while serving in WW2. The album covers the father's life prior to "Blessed Burden" in Travels, showing his shattered state of mind as he struggles to cope with his failed marriage and trauma experienced in war. All the way to his learning of his own brother's death in the Pacific which is the catalyzing event that triggers his downward spiral into alcoholism and domestic abuse.

The latest album is titled Abandoned and it is following the story of the Catholic priest in the song "Cowardice" from Travels. After being saved while fighting in the Western front of WW2, he returns to America and joins the priesthood to pay his debt despite not believing in God. He struggles with heroin addition and has an ongoing affair with the mother from the previous albums. After she overdoses (told both from the older sons point of view in "Empty Days and Sleepless Nights" and from the priest's point of view in "Abandoned"), the priest continues a downward spiral until the younger son from Travels visits him, as described in both "Atonement" and "Cowardice" from the priest and younger son's perspective respectively. The younger son from "Travels" visits the priest seeking absolution for the murder of his father, his brother, and the abandonment of his mother but finding none, kills himself by jumping from the top of the church. The album ends with the priest burying the son and reveals that the younger son was the product of the ongoing heroin fueled affair between the priest and mother from the family in the main story. The fact he was a product of an affair was alluded to several times on previous albums.

Almost two months after the release of Abandoned Defeater parted ways with guitarist Jay Maas citing both personal and creative differences.

On March 5, 2019, the band released a music video for "Mother's Sons" and announced their self-titled album, produced by Will Yip, will be released May 10, 2019.

Members

 Current
 Derek Archambault – lead vocals, guitars, piano, lyrics (2008–present)
 Mike Poulin – bass (2008–present)
 Jake Woodruff – guitars (2009–present)
 Joe Longobardi – drums (2011–present)
 Adam Crowe - guitars (2019–present)

 Former
 Max Barror – bass (2008)
 Gus Pesce – guitar (2008–2010), bass (2011)
 Andy Reitz – drums (2008–2011)
 Jason Maas – guitar, vocals (2008–2015)

Discography
Studio albums
 Travels (2008)
 Empty Days & Sleepless Nights (2011)
 Letters Home (2013)
 Abandoned (2015)
 Defeater (2019)

EPs
 Lost Ground (2009)
 Live on BBC Radio 1 (2012)
 Live at TIHC (2014)

Singles
 "Dear Father" (2011)
 "Still & True" (2016)
 "Where Eagles Dare" (2016) (originally by Misfits)

Compilation contributions
"Blew" (originally by Nirvana; tribute album Doused in Mud, Soaked in Bleach) (2016, Robotic Empire)

Videography
 "Empty Glass" (2011)
 "Bastards" (2013)
 "Spared in Hell" (2015)
 "Unanswered" (2015)
 "Divination" (2015)

References

External links
 Biography on Topshelf Records' website.
 Biography on Bridge Nine Records website.
 Defeater on Myspace

Musical groups established in 2004
Musical groups from Boston
Hardcore punk groups from Massachusetts
Melodic hardcore groups
Emo revival groups
Bridge 9 Records artists
American post-hardcore musical groups
Topshelf Records artists
American emo musical groups